Manju Virattu is a 1994 Tamil-language drama film directed by L. S. Valaiyapathy. The film stars Murali and Mohana. It was released on 9 December 1994.

Plot

Pandi (Murali) and Poovazhagi (Mohana) hate each other since their childhood. According to their custom, Poovazhagi must marry the brave Pandi or the womaniser Dhanraj (Vasu Vikram). The hatred between Pandi and Poovazhagi increases, creating troubles between their respective families. What transpires later forms the crux of the story.

Cast

Murali as Pandian
Mohana as Poovazhagi
Janagaraj as Gnanam
Vasu Vikram as Dhanraj
Shanmugasundaram as Sethupathi, Pandian's father
Srividya as Meenakshi, Pandian's mother
Nambirajan as Sakthivel, Poovazhagi's father
Janaki as Rukmani, Poovazhagi's mother
Sabitha Anand as Chellamma
S. N. Lakshmi
Chitraguptan
Master Vijayakumar as Pandian (child)
Monica as Poovazhagi (child)

Soundtrack

The film score and the soundtrack were composed by Deva. The soundtrack, released in 1994, features 5 tracks with lyrics written by Vaali.

References

1994 films
1990s Tamil-language films
Indian romantic drama films
Films scored by Deva (composer)
1994 romantic drama films